Harrison McEldowney American choreographer known for his theatrical work, for the 1992 Summer Olympics Closing Ceremonies and for Carnegie Hall's "Give My Regards to Broadway: A Salute to 125 Years of Musical Theater", 17 June 1991.

McEldowney was born and grew up in Texas.  He is noted for his comic and witty choreography. He choreographed the 35th Anniversary Tour of American Bandstand and choreographed and directed the Australian Tour of More Dirty Dancing. McEldowney has worked with the Hubbard Street Dance Chicago, River North Chicago Dance Company, the Civic Ballet of Chicago, Ballet Met (Columbus),The Big Muddy Dance Company (St. Louis), Louisville Ballet, Chicago Shakespeare Repertory, Chicago Dance Crash, San Antonio Metropolitan Ballet, Ballet of Texas and the Configurations Dance Company where he is currently (Fall 2006) the Resident Choreographer.

McEldowney contributed choreography to the films Road to Perdition, Children on Their Birthdays (uncredited), and the independent film Vanilla City.

Awards
 After Dark Award from Gay Chicago Magazine for performance and choreography
 1998 Ruth Page Award for choreography
 1999 The first Prince Prize (Prince Charitable Trusts, Chicago), commissioning an original work

References
 Weiss, Hedy (1999) "In art, they trust: Three-year plan aids new works" Chicago Sun-Times 7 October 1999, Thursday, Features, p. 48;
 Davenport, Misha (July 2002) "Choreographer sports new approach" Chicago Sun-Times 28 July 2002, Sunday Show, p. 3;
 Barzel, Ann (August 2000) "Hubbard Finds Firm Footing" Dance Magazine 74(8): p. 72.;

External links
 

 "Guest Artists Fall 2006: Harrison McEldowney" Theatre & Dance College of Fine Arts, University of Texas at Austin;
 "Harrison McEldowney, choreographer" BalletNotes BalletMet Columbus, Columbus Ohio;
 "Harrison McEldowney" Civic Ballet of Chicago, Chicago, Illinois;

American choreographers
American male dancers
Living people
Year of birth missing (living people)